The Rural Municipality of Piapot No. 110 is a rural municipality (RM) in the Canadian province of Saskatchewan within Census Division No. 4 and  Division No. 3. It is located in the southwest portion of the province.

History 
The RM of Piapot No. 110 incorporated as a rural municipality on December 8, 1913.

Geography

Communities and localities 
The following unincorporated communities are within the RM.

Localities
Carnagh
Crane Lake
Cross
Edgell
Kealey Springs
Leghorn
Piapot
Sidewood
Skull Creek

Demographics 

Government 
The RM of Piapot No. 110 is governed by an elected municipal council and an appointed administrator that meets on the second Wednesday of every month. The reeve of the RM is John Wagner while its administrator is Jenny Robinson. The RM's office is located in Piapot.

Transportation

See also 
List of rural municipalities in Saskatchewan

References 

 
P
Division No. 4, Saskatchewan